Nicola Stridoni was a Roman Catholic prelate who served as Bishop of Mylopotamos (1582–?).

Biography
Nicola Stridoni was ordained a priest in the Canons Regular of the Order of the Holy Cross. On 16 May 1582, he was appointed during the papacy of Pope Gregory XIII as Bishop of Mylopotamos. On 17 June 1582, he was consecrated bishop by Giulio Antonio Santorio, Cardinal-Priest of San Bartolomeo all'Isola, with Giovanni Battista Santorio, Bishop of Alife, and Agostino Quinzio, Bishop of Korčula, serving as co-consecrators. It is uncertain how long he served as Bishop of Mylopotamos; the next bishop of record is Ottaviano Semitecolo who was appointed in 1592.

References

External links and additional sources
 (for Chronology of Bishops) 
 (for Chronology of Bishops)  

16th-century Roman Catholic bishops in the Republic of Venice
Bishops appointed by Pope Gregory XIII